Bixby is an unincorporated community in Aurora Township, Steele County, Minnesota, United States.

Geography
Bixby is located between Blooming Prairie and Owatonna along U.S. Highway 218 near its intersection with Steele County Road 4.

Nearby places include Blooming Prairie, Owatonna, Hope, Claremont, and Oak Glen Lake. County Roads 16 and 26 are also in the immediate area.

History
Bixby was laid out in about 1890. The community is named in honor of John Bixby (1814–1890), a pioneer who settled near the town site. A post office was established at Bixby in 1889, and remained in operation until 1982.

References

Unincorporated communities in Minnesota
Unincorporated communities in Steele County, Minnesota